Anoplarchus is a genus of marine ray-finned fishes belonging to the family Stichaeidae, the pricklebacks and shannies. These fishes are found in the eastern Pacific Ocean.

Species
The following species are classified within the genus Alectrias:

References

Xiphisterinae
Taxa described in 1861
Taxa named by Theodore Gill